Interferon alpha-7 is a protein that in humans is encoded by the IFNA7 gene.

References

Further reading